Linda Dowds is a Canadian-British (American resident) make-up artist. She is best known for her work on The Eyes of Tammy Faye, True Detective, The Kennedys and Grey Gardens.

Dowds won an Academy Award in the category Best Makeup and Hairstyling for the film The Eyes of Tammy Faye. Her win was shared with Stephanie Ingram and Justin Raleigh.

Career
Dowds is a member of the Academy of Motion Picture Arts and Sciences, Academy of Television Arts & Sciences and the British Academy of Film and Television Arts. She has worked with celebrities, including Jessica Chastain, Tom Hanks, Woody Harrelson, Hilary Swank and more.

Awards and nominations

References

External links 

Living people
Year of birth missing (living people)
Place of birth missing (living people)
American make-up artists
Best Makeup Academy Award winners
Primetime Emmy Award winners
Best Makeup BAFTA Award winners